Gloria Agblemagnon (born 9 December 1997) is a French Paralympic athlete who competes in shot put in international level events.

References

External links
 
 

1997 births
Living people
Sportspeople from Orléans
Paralympic athletes of France
French female shot putters
Athletes (track and field) at the 2016 Summer Paralympics
Athletes (track and field) at the 2020 Summer Paralympics